The House on Lily Street is a novel by American author Jack Vance. It was published in the United States by Underwood-Miller in 1979 and again in 2002 as part of the Vance Integral Edition (VIE).

Plot introduction
A police detective investigates the murder of a solipsistic social worker who had sought the identity of the mysterious "Mr. Big", an extortionist who threatens welfare cheats with exposure unless he is paid off.

Publication history
First published in January 1979 by Underwood Miller, although believed to have been written in 1958 (http://www.integralarchive.org/biblio-2.htm)

1979 American novels
American mystery novels
Novels by Jack Vance